The 2011 Montreal Impact season was the 18th season of the franchise. It was the club's final season in the NASL before a new Major League Soccer club of the same name, with the same ownership replaces the Impact for the 2012 season.

Standings

Conference table

Results summary

Results by round

Current roster

Current roster
as of August 16, 2011.

Multiple nationalities
  Hicham Aâboubou
  Leonardo Di Lorenzo
  Wandrille Lefevre
  Mircea Ilcu
  Eduardo Sebrango
  Cameron Knowles
  Siniša Ubiparipović

Staff
 Joey Saputo President
 Richard Legendre Executive Vice President
 John Di Terlizzi Vice President
 Nick De Santis Sport Director
 Matt Jordan Director of Soccer Operations
 Nick De Santis Head Coach
 Mauro Biello    Assistant Coach
 Gil Orriols Jansana  Assistant Coach
 Youssef Dahha Goalkeeper Coach
 Adam Braz Team Manager
 Véronique Fortin Director of Game-Day Operations & Promotions
 Dr. Scott Delaney Team Physician

Player movement

Transfers

In

Out

Loans

In

International caps
Players called for international duty during the 2011 season while under contract with the Montreal Impact.

Awards

Team awards

League awards

Weekly awards

Year end awards

Matches

Preseason

NASL regular season

Canadian Championship

Regular Season Friendlies

2011 season stats

Season stats

Points leaders

Disciplinary records
Only players with at least one card included.

Notes and references

2011
Canadian soccer clubs 2011 season
2011 North American Soccer League season
2011 in Quebec
M